Thomas Lane (died 1423?), of Canterbury, Kent, was an English politician.

Family
Lane was the brother of William Lane, also an MP for Canterbury. Lane married, before September 1387, a woman named Katherine, the widow of John Taunton jnr. of Canterbury, who died in 1385.

Career
Lane was a Member of Parliament for Canterbury, Kent in 1399, 1410, May 1413 and November 1414.

References

Year of birth missing
1423 deaths
14th-century births
English MPs 1399
English MPs May 1413
People from Canterbury
English MPs 1410
English MPs November 1414